"Always" is a song by American R&B group Atlantic Starr. The track was the second single from the group's seventh studio album All in the Name of Love (1987). The single was the biggest hit for Atlantic Starr; it peaked at number one on both the US Billboard Hot 100 and Billboard Hot R&B/Hip-Hop Songs charts in June 1987, being the band's only number one song. The song also spent two weeks atop the U.S. adult contemporary chart. In July, it topped the Canadian RPM 100 national singles chart, where it remained for two weeks. The British Phonographic Industry (BPI) certified it silver.

Charts

Weekly charts

Year-end charts

Cover versions and appearances
In 2000, pop act Boyz N Girlz United included a cover version of the song on their self-titled debut album. In 2008, it was covered by Filipina singer-actress Iya Villania as a duet with Jay-R on her album Finally!. Johnny Mathis recorded the song with Mone't on his album A Night to Remember.

MF Doom sampled "Always" for his song "Dead Bent", from his album Operation: Doomsday.

 The song appeared in That's Entertainment in 1987 for the Metro Manila Film Festival premiered in Ultra on December 27, 1987.
 The song also appears in Mii the episode In The Love.
 The song appeared in 1987 episodes of the daytime soap operas Another World, General Hospital, and Loving  as well as 1988 episodes of All My Children and The Young and the Restless. 
 The song in Cantonese version appears as theme song in 1991 Radio Television Hong Kong (RTHK) Fiction Family 《小說家族》series 12 &13「Hey! Brother」named as 情在破滅時 (Break Up Moment) duet by 甄楚倩 (Yolinda Yan) and 杜德偉 (Alex Tao).
 The song appears in the game Karaoke Revolution Party, and in the 2011 film, Diary of a Wimpy Kid: Rodrick Rules.

See also
List of Hot Adult Contemporary number ones of 1987
List of Billboard Hot 100 number ones of 1987
List of number-one R&B singles of 1987 (U.S.)

References

External links
[ AMG AllMusic]
 

1987 songs
1987 singles
Billboard Hot 100 number-one singles
Cashbox number-one singles
Atlantic Starr songs
RPM Top Singles number-one singles
Pop ballads
Contemporary R&B ballads
Male–female vocal duets
Warner Records singles
1980s ballads
Songs about marriage